Through statutes of 30 January 1937, the German National Order for Art and Science was an award created by Adolf Hitler as a replacement for the Nobel Prize (he had forbidden Germans to accept the latter award in 1936 after an anti-Nazi German writer, Carl von Ossietzky, was awarded the 1935 Nobel Peace Prize).  The prize was to be awarded each year to three outstanding German citizens who would receive 100,000 Reichsmarks which could be equally divided. Along with the prize money the recipient also received a certificate with the Order.

The Order, a round four pointed platinum star, with four gold National Eagles attached was designed by sculptor Müller-Erfurt, Berlin. It was to be worn on the left breast. In the centre is a medallion with a red enameled centre with the gold head of Pallas Athene. On an ivory coloured enameled background in gold letters was the inscription FÜR KUNST UND WISSENSCHAFT (For Art and Science). This was surrounded by diamonds set in a gold border.

The total number of National Prizes awarded between 1937 and 1939 was nine, making it the rarest award given in Nazi Germany. Due to the outbreak of the Second World War in Europe, no further awards were made.

Awardees
The German National Prize was awarded to nine people.

1937 
The award announcement was held on 7 September 1937 and the award ceremony took place on 30 January 1938 by Adolf Hitler in the Reich Chancellery. The first five winners were:

1938 
The award announcement was made on 6 September 1938, the presentation by Hitler took place 30 January 1939 in the Chancellery. The winners of this second year were:

See also
Lenin Prize
Stalin Prize

Notes

References
 
 Jörg Nimmergut: Deutsche Orden und Ehrenzeichen bis 1945. Band 4: Württemberg II – Deutsches Reich. Zentralstelle für Wissenschaftliche Ordenskunde, München 2001, ; pp. 1910–1917.

Orders, decorations, and medals of Nazi Germany
Awards established in 1937
Awards disestablished in 1939
1939 disestablishments in Germany
Nobel Peace Prize
1937 establishments in Germany
Science in Nazi Germany